Nolin is an unincorporated community in Hardin County, Kentucky, United States. The Nolin Banking Company, which is listed on the National Register of Historic Places, is located in Nolin.

References

Unincorporated communities in Hardin County, Kentucky
Unincorporated communities in Kentucky